Jarosław Kaszowski (born May 24, 1978 in Gliwice) is a Polish footballer who plays for Fortuna Gliwice.

Career

Club
In July 2011, he joined Ruch Radzionków on a one-year contract.

References

External links
 

Polish footballers
Ekstraklasa players
Piast Gliwice players
Ruch Radzionków players
1978 births
Living people
Sportspeople from Gliwice
Association football midfielders